Peter van Dijk (February 13, 1929 – September 7, 2019) was an American architect who designed many buildings in Ohio, including the Blossom Music Center in Cuyahoga Falls.

van Dijk graduated from Mamaroneck High School in Mamaroneck, New York, at age 16, and then studied engineering at Cornell University. After two years, he transferred to the University of Oregon, where he graduated in 1953 with a degree in architecture .

References

1929 births
2019 deaths
Cornell University College of Engineering alumni
University of Oregon alumni
MIT School of Architecture and Planning alumni
Architects from Cleveland
20th-century American architects
21st-century American architects
20th-century Dutch architects
People from Surabaya
People from Cleveland Heights, Ohio
Mamaroneck High School alumni
American people of Dutch descent